Poul Cederquist (29 June 1916 – 25 May 1993) was a Danish athlete. He competed in the men's hammer throw at the 1948 Summer Olympics and the 1952 Summer Olympics.

References

1916 births
1993 deaths
Athletes (track and field) at the 1948 Summer Olympics
Athletes (track and field) at the 1952 Summer Olympics
Danish male hammer throwers
Olympic athletes of Denmark
Athletes from Copenhagen
20th-century Danish people